Franco Johan Naudé (born 28 March 1996) is a South African professional rugby union player for the Lokomotiv Penza in Russian Rugby Championship. His regular position is centre.

Rugby career

2013–2014: Schoolboy rugby

Naudé was born in Pretoria. He started all three matches in each tournament, scoring a try for the Blue Bulls in the 2013 tournament against KwaZulu-Natal.

2015–2017: Youth rugby

After high school, Naudé joined the ' academy, He firmly established himself in the  team, starting all fourteen of their matches in the 2015 Under-19 Provincial Championship.

In March 2016, he was included in a South Africa Under-20 training squad, and made the cut in a reduced provisional squad a week later.

On 10 May 2016, he was included in the final South Africa Under-20 squad for the 2016 World Rugby Under 20 Championship tournament to be held in Manchester in England. He started their opening match in Pool C of the tournament on the bench, appearing for the final 25 minutes as South Africa came from behind to beat Japan 59–19. He started at inside centre for their second pool match, a 13–19 defeat to Argentina, and again found himself on the bench as South Africa bounced back to secure a 40-31 bonus-point victory over France in their final pool match. The result meant South Africa secured a semi-final place as the best runner-up in the competition, and Naudé again played off the bench in their semi-final match as they faced three-time champions England. The hosts proved too strong for South Africa, knocking them out of the competition with a 39–17 victory, and they also lost the third-place play-off match against Argentina, with Naudé starting the match as the South American side beat South Africa for the second time in the tournament, convincingly winning 49–19 to condemn South Africa to fourth place in the competition.

Naudé returned to domestic action to make a further two appearances for the Blue Bulls in the 2016 Currie Cup qualification series; he played off the bench in their 26–35 defeat to the  before starting their match against  in East London. Naudé scored his first try in first class rugby in that match, helping his team to a 45–26 victory and seventh place on the log.

He then made six starts for the  team in the 2016 Under-21 Provincial Championship. He scored four tries during the season – one against  and a hat-trick against  in a 52–38 victory in their final match of the regular season. He finished as his team's joint top-scorer, alongside namesake Dewald Naudé.

In November 2016, he was named in the  Super Rugby team's extended training squad during the team's preparations for the 2017 Super Rugby season.

References

South African rugby union players
Living people
1996 births
Rugby union players from Pretoria
Rugby union centres
Blue Bulls players
South Africa Under-20 international rugby union players
Bulls (rugby union) players
Pumas (Currie Cup) players
Lions (United Rugby Championship) players
Golden Lions players
VVA Podmoskovye players
Slava Moscow players
Lokomotiv Penza players